Richie Gilmore (c. 1966) is the Vice President in charge of Racing for Dale Earnhardt, Inc. (DEI).

Background
Gilmore worked at Hendrick Motorsports for eight years. He was hired by DEI to be the team's head engine builder in 1998. He was promoted to his current position by DEI CEO/co-founder Teresa Earnhardt in January 2004 after Ty Norris resigned from the position.

References

External links
 nascar.com article announcing Gilmore's promotion at DEI
 Interview with Gilmore at nascar.com

1960s births
Living people
NASCAR people